Wang Mengkui (born April 1938) is a Chinese politician who served as director of the Development Research Center of the State Council from 1998 to 2007.

He was an alternate member of the 14th Central Committee of the Chinese Communist Party and a member of the 15th Central Committee of the Chinese Communist Party.

Biography
Wang was born in Wen County, Henan, in April 1938. In 1958, he entered Peking University, majoring in political economics. He joined the Chinese Communist Party (CCP) in June 1956.

After graduating in 1964, he was assigned to Red Flag magazine as an editor, a post he kept until May 1969. In August 1975, he was transferred to the Research Office of the First Ministry of Machinery Industry, and held that office until February 1979, when he was appointed as an official in the General Office of the Chinese Communist Party and the Secretariat of the Chinese Communist Party. He was an official in the State Planning Commission (now National Development and Reform Commission) in September 1987, and was elevated to deputy director of its Economic Research Center in September 1988. In July 1990, he became deputy director of the Development Research Center of the State Council, rising to director in April 1995. In March 2003, he took office as vice chairperson of the National People's Congress Financial and Economic Affairs Committee.

Publications

References

1938 births
Living people
People from Wen County, Henan
Peking University alumni
People's Republic of China politicians from Henan
Chinese Communist Party politicians from Henan
Members of the 15th Central Committee of the Chinese Communist Party
Alternate members of the 14th Central Committee of the Chinese Communist Party
Members of the Standing Committee of the 10th National People's Congress